Aleksandar Ivanović (born 20 November 1988) is a Serbian football midfielder who currently works as a youth coach at Metalac Gornji Milanovac.

Club career

Metalac Gornji Milanovac
He started playing football at the age of 9 in Metalac Gornji Milanovac. He made his debut for first team at the age of 17. Also, he was loaned to Bregalnica Štip for one season. He was nominated as a player with strongest shot in team.

In mid-January 2019, Metalac announced that Ivanović from now on would play for amateur club Takovo and also being a youth coach at Metalac at the same time.

References

External links
 
 Aleksandar Ivanović Stats at utakmica.rs

1988 births
Living people
People from Gornji Milanovac
Association football midfielders
Serbian footballers
FK Metalac Gornji Milanovac players
Serbian First League players
Serbian SuperLiga players
Serbian expatriate footballers
Expatriate footballers in North Macedonia
FK Bregalnica Štip players